Kitchen is a 1966 feature-length underground film directed by Andy Warhol and Ronald Tavel, and starring Edie Sedgwick, Rene Ricard, Tavel, Roger Trudeau, David McCabe, Donald Lyons, and Electrah. The entire film takes place in the New York City kitchen of Bud Wirtschafter, the sound man.

According to the WarholStars website, the film was made in late May 1965 and premiered March 3, 1966 at the Film-makers' Cooperative in New York City.

See also
List of American films of 1966
Andy Warhol filmography

References

External links

Kitchen (1965) at WarholStars

1966 films
Films directed by Andy Warhol
American independent films
1960s English-language films
1960s American films